is a Japanese football player currently playing for F.C. Machida Zelvia.

Club career statistics
Updated to 23 February 2016.

References

External links

Yokohama FC official

1987 births
Living people
Association football people from Miyazaki Prefecture
Japanese footballers
J1 League players
J2 League players
J3 League players
Kawasaki Frontale players
Yokohama FC players
Tochigi SC players
FC Machida Zelvia players
Association football forwards